Andrew Carlton is an American singer, songwriter and music producer. He is a graduate of the University of Tennessee, where he was the costumed mascot, Smokey.  His single "Jesus, Hold Me" spent 13 weeks on Billboard's Adult Contemporary chart before hitting No. 18 and becoming the highest-charting single by an Independent Artist in 2007. He is most known for his hit radio single "Hold Me Up".

Carlton has toured with other artists Rebecca St James, Aaron Shust, and Newsong.

Discography
2007 I Know Better (Bakertown)
2004 Falling In (Flying Leap)
1999 Hold Me Up (Audio X)

References

External links 
Official website

1977 births
Living people
American singer-songwriters
American male singer-songwriters
University of Tennessee alumni
21st-century American singers
21st-century American male singers